Belvedere Ostrense is a comune (municipality) in the Province of Ancona in the Italian region Marche, located about  west of Ancona.

Belvedere Ostrense borders the following municipalities: Castelplanio, Maiolati Spontini, Montecarotto, Morro d'Alba, Ostra, Poggio San Marcello, San Marcello, Senigallia.

References

Cities and towns in the Marche